Yevgeny Kafelnikov was the five time defending champion but lost in the semifinals to Sjeng Schalken.

Paul-Henri Mathieu won in the final 4–6, 6–2, 6–0 against Schalken.

Seeds

Draw

Finals

Top half

Bottom half

External links
 Draw

Kremlin Cup
Kremlin Cup